James Alipius Goold (4 November 1812–11 June 1886) was an Australian Augustinian friar and the founding Catholic Archbishop of Melbourne in Australia.

Life

Early years
Goold was born in Cork, Ireland. Upon leaving school he entered the Order of St. Augustine and was sent to Perugia, Italy to study. (From 1695 until the 19th Century, Irish students for the Catholic priesthood were often sent to the Continent to study due to the then existing penal laws in Britain and Ireland.)

Missioner
Goold was ordained in Perugia on 9 July 1835 at the age of twenty-three. In 1837 he was appointed to the student house of the Irish Augustinians in Rome, but in Easter 1837 he had a chance meeting on the steps of the Augustinian church of Santa Maria del Popolo with Benedictine William Bernard Ullathorne, Vicar General of New Holland (Australia). Ullathorne was in Rome recruiting priests for Australia, and Goold was convinced by Ullathorne to commit himself to seven years of missionary work in Australia, subject to his order's approval.

In 1838, Father Goold arrived in Australia aboard the Upton Castle. Also on board were Governor and Lady Gipps. Goold worked initially with Archbishop John Bede Polding in Sydney, becoming parish priest at Campbelltown, New South Wales, where in 1841, he built, St John's Church in 1841. He spent a considerable amount of his time traveling through the country on horseback.

Bishop and Archbishop
Pope Pius IX appointed him Bishop of Melbourne, and he was consecrated bishop by John Bede Polding on 6 August 1848, (the feast of the Transfiguration) in old St Mary's Cathedral in Sydney. He transferred to Melbourne, traveling overland in 19 days, being installed on 8 October 1848 in his first Cathedral, St Francis Church in Lonsdale Street. Goold was only the second Roman Catholic bishop in Australia. He arrived in his new town to find only two Catholic church buildings, four priests in the diocese, no religious sisters or brothers, and a population around 11,000. After negotiations begun in 1848, five acres of land on Eastern Hill were finally granted by the crown on 1 April 1851 and shortly afterwards became the site of St Patrick's cathedral and the bishop's palace. The discovery of gold in this year enormously increased the population of Melbourne, and it was realized that the church of St Patrick that had been begun would be inadequate. It was decided to build a great cathedral – St Patrick's Cathedral, Melbourne. In 1858 William Wardell, then government architect, was asked to draw up the plans, and the first stone of the new building was laid in December 1858. For the remainder of Goold's life he was much occupied with the raising of funds for the cathedral. Within thirteen years of arriving in Melbourne, the capable and determined Goold had increased the number of church buildings in Melbourne to 64.

As an Irishman of his times and immediate history, Goold had experienced the consequences of sectarianism, and in Australia disputed the title of "Bishop of Melbourne" with the then Anglican bishop of Melbourne, Dr Charles Perry. Under Australian law (unlike British law at the time) Goold was found to have equal right to the title.

Goold was an expansionist. He attempted to persuade his home Irish province of the Augustinians to establish a seminary and novitiate in Melbourne. Though the Irish province agreed to Goold's requests in principle, the plan did not come to fruition in his lifetime. The first Australian Augustinian was not ordained until 1940, and the Australian Province was not formally established as separate from its Irish founding province until 1952.

The Irish province was already sending missionaries to the US, India and England, and did not then consider an Australian foundation viable. Nevertheless, Goold commenced the building of Melbourne's St Patrick's Cathedral on 8 December 1858. In order to expand Catholic education, in 1857 Bishop Goold succeeded in bringing the Mercy Sisters from Perth into the diocese. He also introduced the Irish Christian Brothers to Melbourne in 1867. Other congregations he brought to the diocese include the Jesuits, and the Faithful Companions of Jesus. Goold engaged enthusiastically in Australian public debate over the issue of State Aid for Catholic education, and was politically pro-active in opposing what he referred to as the 'godless compulsory education' of state schools.

From late 1869 to 1870 Goold attended the First Vatican Council in Rome, where he also met with three other Augustinian and Irish bishops. On 10 May 1874, while still in Rome, Goold was made Archbishop of Melbourne. Towards the end of his life his health began to suffer but it was difficult to persuade him to relax from his duties.

Archbishop Goold died at Melbourne on 11 June 1886 and was buried in St Patrick's Cathedral, Melbourne.

References

Bibliography

External links
 St Patrick's Cathedral website
 James Goold on Catholic hierarchy.org

1812 births
1886 deaths
Clergy from Cork (city)
Augustinian friars
Roman Catholic archbishops of Melbourne
Irish expatriate Roman Catholic archbishops
Irish emigrants to colonial Australia
19th-century Roman Catholic archbishops in Australia
Burials at St Patrick's Cathedral, Melbourne
Settlers of Melbourne
Roman Catholic bishops of Melbourne